Biocomputing may refer to:
 
 Biological computing, systems of biologically derived molecules that perform computational processes
 DNA computing, a form of biological computing that uses DNA
 Bioinformatics, the application of statistics and computer science to the field of molecular biology